Non-histone chromosomal protein HMG-14 is a protein that in humans is encoded by the HMGN1 gene.

Function 

Chromosomal protein HMG14 and its close analog HMG17 (MIM 163910) bind to the inner side of the nucleosomal DNA, potentially altering the interaction between the DNA and the histone octamer. The 2 proteins may be involved in the process that maintains transcribable genes in a unique chromatin conformation. Their ubiquitous distribution and relative abundance, as well as the high evolutionary conservation of the DNA-binding domain of the HMG14 family of proteins, suggest that they may be involved in an important cellular function.

Interactions 

HMGN1 has been shown to interact with YWHAZ.

See also
 HMGN2
High mobility group protein HMG14 and HMG17

References

Further reading